Grayson may refer to:

Places

Canada 
 Grayson, Saskatchewan
 Rural Municipality of Grayson No. 184, Saskatchewan

United States 
 Grayson, California
 Grayson, Georgia
 Grayson High School
 Grayson, Kentucky
 Grayson, Louisiana
 Grayson, Missouri
 Grayson, North Carolina
 Grayson, Ohio
 Grayson, Oklahoma
 Grayson, Utah, former name of Blanding, Utah
 Grayson County (disambiguation)

United Kingdom 
 Grayson Green, a small village in the ward of Harrington, Cumbria

Other uses 
 Grayson (surname)
 Grayson (given name)
 Grayson (film) (2004), fan film trailer
 Grayson County College, a community college
 Grayson Lake, a  reservoir
 Grayson Stadium, a stadium in Savannah, Georgia, United States
 Grayson (comic book), published by DC Comics

See also 
 Greyson, a given name and a surname
 Grason (disambiguation)